William Francis McCabe (October 28, 1892  – September 2, 1966) was a professional baseball player who played in the Major Leagues from 1918 to 1920. He would play for the Chicago Cubs and Brooklyn Robins.

Biography
He was born on October 28, 1892 in Chicago. McCabe appeared in three games of the 1918 World Series. As a pinch-runner in Game 4, he scored the tying run in an eighth-inning rally at Fenway Park against Boston pitcher Babe Ruth, but the Cubs lost the game 3–2 on a wild pitch in the bottom of the eighth. He died on September 2, 1966 in Chicago.

McCabe also made one appearance in the 1920 World Series. He pinch-ran with two outs in the ninth inning of Game 6, which Brooklyn was losing 1–0. Duster Mails retired the final batter for a Cleveland Indians victory.

During his career, McCabe batted 199 times and hit just .161, with five extra-base hits.

External links

1892 births
1966 deaths
Major League Baseball infielders
Major League Baseball outfielders
Chicago Cubs players
Brooklyn Robins players
Baseball players from Chicago
Richmond Colts players
Newport News Shipbuilders players
Fort William-Port Arthur Canucks players
St. Joseph Drummers players
Hutchinson Wheatshockers players
Rochester Colts players
Los Angeles Angels (minor league) players
Atlanta Crackers players
Seattle Indians players
Virginia Ore Diggers players